Haunted: Latin America is a 2021 reality television show streaming television.

Cast 
 Laura Tovar
 Pablo Cesar Sanchez
 Pablo Guisa Koestinger
 Alejandro Restrepo

References

External links
 
 

Spanish-language Netflix original programming